Gloria De Leon (born December 16, 1952) has been involved with the National Hispanic Institute since its establishment and has served as the organization's Executive Vice President since 1982.

Early life 
Born in McAllen, Texas, De Leon attended McAllen High School and later entered the University of Texas Pan American where she received her Bachelor of Science in Social Work. After her undergraduate coursework, De Leon served in various management positions in both the state and federal government.

Career 
In 1983, Gloria De Leon decided to leave government to pursue the vision of creating a leadership institute for Latino youth with Ernesto Nieto, founder and current president of the National Hispanic Institute (NHI). Under the leadership of both De Leon and Nieto, the National Hispanic Institute has worked with over 120 institutions of higher education and 70,000 high-ability youth from across the nation.

Awards & recognitions
Among her numerous recognitions, De Leon has received an Honorary Doctor of Humane Letters Degree from Texas Wesleyan University in Fort Worth, Texas and the Distinguished Alumnus Award from the University of Texas Pan American.

Appearances in Published Works
De Leon has written extensively, via the NHI regarding the future leadership need of the Latino community both in the United States as well as globally.  Additionally, she has been featured in the creative non-fiction book Chicanas in Charge: Texas Women in the Public Arena by Jose Angel Gutierrez (Author), Michelle Melendez (Author), Sonia A. Noyola (Author).

Additionally, De Leon plays a heavy role in Third Reality: Crafting a 21st Century Latino Agenda by Ernesto Nieto, her husband, and founder and current president of the National Hispanic Institute.

Other work
De Leon continues her involvement in the community by serving as a consultant regarding leadership, education, & Latino youth development.

References

University of Texas–Pan American alumni
American people of Mexican descent
Living people
1952 births
People from McAllen, Texas